Harry Potter and the Deathly Hallows is a fantasy novel written by British author J. K. Rowling and the seventh and final novel of the main Harry Potter series. It was released on 21 July 2007 in the United Kingdom by Bloomsbury Publishing, in the United States by Scholastic, and in Canada by Raincoast Books. The novel chronicles the events directly following Harry Potter and the Half-Blood Prince (2005) and the final confrontation between the wizards Harry Potter and Lord Voldemort.

Deathly Hallows shattered sales records upon release, surpassing marks set by previous titles of the Harry Potter series. It holds the Guinness World Record for most novels sold within 24 hours of release, with 8.3 million sold in the US and 2.65 million in the UK. Reception to the book was generally positive, and the book won the 2008 Colorado Blue Spruce Book Award, and the American Library Association named it the "Best Book for Young Adults". A film adaptation of the novel was released in two parts: Harry Potter and the Deathly Hallows – Part 1 in November 2010 and Part 2 in July 2011.

Plot

Background
Throughout the six previous novels in the series, the main character Harry Potter has struggled with the difficulties of adolescence along with being famous as the only person ever to survive the Killing Curse. The curse was cast by Tom Riddle, better known as Lord Voldemort, a powerful evil wizard who murdered Harry's parents and attempted to kill Harry as a baby, due to a prophecy which claimed Harry would be able to stop him. As an orphan, Harry was placed in the care of his Muggle (non-magical) relatives Petunia Dursley and Vernon Dursley, with their son Dudley Dursley.

In The Philosopher's Stone, Harry re-enters the wizarding world at age 11 and enrols in Hogwarts School of Witchcraft and Wizardry. He befriends fellow students Ron Weasley and Hermione Granger and is mentored by the school's headmaster, Albus Dumbledore. He also meets Professor Severus Snape, who dislikes and bullies him. Harry fights Voldemort several times while at school as the wizard tries to regain a physical form. In Goblet of Fire, Harry is mysteriously entered in the Triwizard Tournament, which he discovers is a trap designed to allow the return of Lord Voldemort to full strength. In Order of the Phoenix, Harry and several of his friends face off against Voldemort's followers, the Death Eaters. In Half-Blood Prince, Harry learns that Voldemort has divided his soul into several parts, creating "Horcruxes" from various unknown objects to contain them. In this way, he has ensured his immortality as long as at least one of the Horcruxes still exists. Two of these had already been destroyed: a diary destroyed by Harry in Chamber of Secrets and a ring destroyed by Dumbledore shortly before the events of Half-Blood Prince. Dumbledore takes Harry along in an attempt to destroy a third Horcrux, Slytherin's locket. However, the Horcrux had been taken by an unknown wizard, and upon their return, Dumbledore is ambushed and disarmed by Draco Malfoy. Draco cannot bring himself to kill Dumbledore, so Snape kills him instead.

Overview
At the beginning of the book, Harry is about to turn seventeen and will lose his deceased mother's protection. Members of the Order of the Phoenix relocate the Dursleys, and prepare to move Harry to The Burrow by flying him there, using Harry's friends as decoys. Death Eaters attack them upon departure, and in the ensuing battle, "Mad-Eye" Moody and Hedwig are killed while George Weasley is wounded. Voldemort arrives to kill Harry, but Harry's wand fends him off on its own.

Harry, Ron, and Hermione prepare to hunt down Voldemort's four remaining Horcruxes. They each are given an object in Dumbledore's will: a Golden Snitch for Harry, a Deluminator for Ron, and The Tales of Beedle the Bard, for Hermione. Harry is also bequeathed the Sword of Godric Gryffindor, but the Ministry prevents him from receiving it. During Bill Weasley and Fleur Delacour's wedding, the Ministry of Magic falls to Voldemort; Death Eaters attack the wedding reception. The trio flee to 12 Grimmauld Place, Sirius Black's family home that was left to Harry.

They learn that Sirius's late brother, Regulus, stole the Horcrux locket and hid it in the house. It was later stolen by Mundungus Fletcher. House-elf Kreacher locates Fletcher, who says the locket was taken by Dolores Umbridge. The trio infiltrate the Ministry and steal the locket from Umbridge, but Grimmauld Place is compromised in their escape. They hide in the forest, unable to destroy the locket and with no further leads. The locket's dark nature affects Ron, and he abandons the group. Harry and Hermione learn about Dumbledore's past with dark wizard, Gellert Grindelwald. They travel to Godric's Hollow, Harry's birthplace, where they are attacked by Nagini who was disguised as Bathilda Bagshot. They escape, but Harry's wand is badly damaged. One night, a doe Patronus guides Harry to a pond containing the Sword of Godric Gryffindor. When Harry tries to recover it, the locket around his neck nearly kills him. Ron, guided back by the Deluminator, saves him and destroys the locket with the sword, in turn, destroying Voldemort's Horcrux contained in it.

In Dumbledore's book, Hermione identifies a symbol also worn by Luna Lovegood's father Xenophilius Lovegood. When they visit him, he tells them of the mythical Deathly Hallows: the Elder Wand, an unbeatable wand; the Resurrection Stone, which can summon the dead; and an infallible Invisibility Cloak.  Xenophilius acts strangely, and the trio realize Luna has been captured. Xenophillius summons Death Eaters to catch them in exchange for Luna's freedom, but the three escape. Harry deduces that Voldemort is hunting the Elder Wand, which had passed to Dumbledore after he defeated Grindelwald. Harry also deduces that his Invisibility Cloak is the third Hallow, and his Snitch contains the Resurrection Stone.

The trio are captured and taken to Malfoy Manor. Bellatrix tortures Hermione, believing they stole Gryffindor's sword from her Gringotts vault. With help from Dobby the house-elf, they escape to Bill and Fleur's cottage along with fellow prisoners, including the goblin Griphook. During the escape, Bellatrix kills Dobby. Harry has a vision of Voldemort stealing the Elder Wand from Dumbledore's tomb. The trio decide to break into Bellatrix's vault, believing another Horcrux is there. With Griphook's help, they break in, retrieve Hufflepuff's cup, and escape, though Griphook steals Gryffindor's sword in the process. Harry has a vision of Voldemort being informed of the heist and deciding to check his Horcruxes, thus revealing the remaining ones to Harry: Nagini, and one hidden at Hogwarts.

The trio enter Hogwarts with help from Dumbledore's brother Aberforth. Voldemort, alerted to Harry's whereabouts, mounts an assault on Hogwarts. The teachers and students mobilize to defend the school. Ron and Hermione destroy Hufflepuff's cup with basilisk fangs from the Chamber of Secrets. Harry discovers that Ravenclaw's diadem is the Horcrux. The trio find the diadem in the Room of Requirement but are ambushed by Draco, Crabbe and Goyle. Crabbe attacks them using a cursed fire, but fails to control it; the fire kills him and destroys the diadem. Meanwhile, many are killed in Voldemort's assault, including Remus Lupin, Nymphadora Tonks, and Fred Weasley.

Voldemort feels the Elder Wand is not performing as expected. Believing that Snape, having killed Dumbledore, is its true master, Voldemort murders Snape. Harry arrives as Snape dies, and Snape passes him memories to view in the Pensieve. They reveal Snape loved Harry's mother and acted as a double agent against Voldemort. He had watched over the trio, conjuring the doe Patronus. It is also revealed that Dumbledore was dying after mishandling the ring Horcrux, and had planned his "murder" at Snape's hands. Harry also learns that he is an unintentional Horcrux, unbeknownst to Voldemort, and must die at Voldemort's hands to render him mortal. Harry gives himself up, instructing Neville Longbottom to kill Nagini. On the way, he uses the Resurrection Stone within the Snitch to reunite with his parents and other deceased loved ones. He drops the stone as he meets Voldemort, who casts the Killing Curse on him.

Harry awakens in a dreamlike location resembling King's Cross and is greeted by Dumbledore. He explains that Voldemort's original Killing Curse left a fragment of his soul in Harry, causing their connection. The latest Killing Curse destroyed that soul fragment, allowing Harry to return to life or to "go on". Harry returns to life and feigns death. Voldemort calls for a truce at Hogwarts and demands their surrender. Neville, however, pulls Gryffindor's sword from the Sorting Hat and kills Nagini.

The battle resumes, with Molly Weasley killing Bellatrix, and Harry revealing himself to Voldemort and engaging him in a final battle. He explains that the Elder Wand's loyalty transfers upon the defeat, not the killing, of its former master. Draco, not Snape, had been the Elder Wand's master, having disarmed Dumbledore before Snape killed him. Having disarmed Draco at Malfoy Manor, Harry now commands the Elder Wand. Voldemort casts the Killing Curse at Harry, but the spell rebounds, killing Voldemort. Harry then uses the Elder Wand to repair his original wand before returning the Elder Wand to Dumbledore's tomb. He keeps his Invisibility Cloak, and lets the Resurrection Stone remain lost. The Wizarding World returns to peace.

Epilogue
Nineteen years later, the main characters are seeing their children off to Hogwarts. Harry and Ginny have three children: James Sirius, Albus Severus, and Lily Luna. Ron and Hermione have two children, Rose and Hugo. Harry's godson Teddy Lupin is found kissing Bill and Fleur's daughter Victoire; Draco and his wife are sending off their son Scorpius. Albus is departing for his first year, and worries he will be placed in Slytherin. Harry reassures him, telling his son of Snape's bravery, and that the Sorting Hat could account for his wishes. As his scar has not hurt in 19 years, the narrator concludes that "all was well".

Background

Franchise
Harry Potter and the Philosopher's Stone, the first book in the series, was published by Bloomsbury on 30 June 1997. The second book, Harry Potter and the Chamber of Secrets was published on 2 July 1998. Harry Potter and the Prisoner of Azkaban was then published a year later on 8 July 1999. Harry Potter and the Goblet of Fire was published on 8 July 2000. Harry Potter and the Order of the Phoenix was published on 21 June 2003. Harry Potter and the Half-Blood Prince was published on 16 July 2005, and sold 9 million copies in the first 24 hours of its worldwide release.

Choice of title

The title of the book refers to three mythical objects featured in the story, collectively known as the "Deathly Hallows"—an unbeatable wand (the Elder Wand), a stone to bring the dead to life (the Resurrection Stone), and a cloak of invisibility. Shortly before releasing the title, J. K. Rowling announced that she had considered three titles for the book. The final title was released to the public on 21 December 2006, via a special Christmas-themed hangman puzzle on Rowling's website, confirmed shortly afterwards by the book's publishers. When asked during a live chat about the other titles she had been considering, Rowling mentioned Harry Potter and the Elder Wand and Harry Potter and the Peverell Quest.

Rowling on finishing the book

Rowling completed the book while staying at the Balmoral Hotel in Edinburgh in January 2007, leaving a signed statement on a marble bust of Hermes in her room that reads "J. K. Rowling finished writing Harry Potter and the Deathly Hallows in this room (552) on 11 January 2007". In a statement on her website, she said, "I've never felt such a mixture of extreme emotions in my life, never dreamed I could feel simultaneously heartbroken and euphoric." She compared her mixed feelings to those expressed by Charles Dickens in the preface of the 1850 edition of David Copperfield, "a two-years' imaginative task". "To which," she added, "I can only sigh, try seventeen years, Charles". She ended her message by saying "Deathly Hallows is my favourite, and that is the most wonderful way to finish the series".

When asked before publication about the forthcoming book, Rowling stated that she could not change the ending even if she wanted. "These books have been plotted for such a long time, and for six books now, that they're all leading a certain direction. So, I really can't". She also commented that the final volume related closely to the previous book in the series, Harry Potter and the Half-Blood Prince, "almost as though they are two-halves of the same novel". She has said that the last chapter of the book was written "in something like 1990", as part of her earliest work on the series. Rowling also revealed she originally wrote the last words to be something like: 'Only those who he loved could see his lightning scar. Rowling changed this because she did not want people to think Voldemort would rise again and to say that Harry's mission was over.

Major themes

Death
In a 2006 interview, J. K. Rowling said that the main theme of the series is Harry dealing with death, which was influenced by her mother's death in 1990, from multiple sclerosis. Lev Grossman of Time stated that the main theme of the series was the overwhelming importance of continuing to love in the face of death.

Living in a corrupted society
Academics and journalists have developed many other interpretations of themes in the books, some more complex than others, and some including political subtexts. Themes such as normality, oppression, survival, and overcoming imposing odds have all been considered as prevalent throughout the series. Similarly, the theme of making one's way through adolescence and "going over one's most harrowing ordeals—and thus coming to terms with them" has also been considered. Rowling has stated that the books comprise "a prolonged argument for tolerance, a prolonged plea for an end to bigotry" and that also pass on a message to "question authority and ... not assume that the establishment or the press tells you all of the truth".

Some political commentators have seen J. K. Rowling's portrayal of the bureaucratised Ministry of Magic and the oppressive measures taken by the Ministry in the later books (like making attendance at Hogwarts School compulsory and the "registration of Mudbloods" with the Ministry) as an allegory criticising the state.

Christian allegories

The Harry Potter series has been criticised for supposedly supporting witchcraft and the occult. Before publication of Deathly Hallows, Rowling refused to speak out about her religion, stating, "If I talk too freely, every reader, whether 10 or 60, will be able to guess what's coming in the books". However, many have commented on Christian allegories that appear in Deathly Hallows. For example, Harry dies and then comes back to life to save mankind, like Christ. The location where this occurs is King's Cross. Rowling also stated that "my belief and my struggling with religious belief ... I think is quite apparent in this book", which is shown as Harry struggles with his faith in Dumbledore.

Deathly Hallows begins with a pair of epigraphs, one by Quaker leader William Penn and one from Aeschylus' The Libation Bearers. Of this, Rowling said "I really enjoyed choosing those two quotations because one is pagan, of course, and one is from a Christian tradition. I'd known it was going to be those two passages since Chamber was published. I always knew [that] if I could use them at the beginning of book seven then I'd cued up the ending perfectly. If they were relevant, then I went where I needed to go. They just say it all to me, they really do".

When Harry visits his parents' grave, the biblical reference "The last enemy that shall be destroyed is death" (1 Corinthians 15:26) is inscribed on the grave. The Dumbledores' family tomb also holds a biblical quote: "Where your treasure is, there your heart will be also", which is from Matthew 6:21. Rowling states, "They're very British books, so on a very practical note Harry was going to find biblical quotations on tombstones ... [but] I think those two particular quotations he finds on the tombstones at Godric's Hollow, they sum up – they almost epitomise the whole series".

Harry Potter pundit John Granger additionally noted that one of the reasons the Harry Potter books were so popular is their use of literary alchemy (similar to Romeo and Juliet, C. S. Lewis's Perelandra and Charles Dickens's A Tale of Two Cities) and vision symbolism. In this model, authors weave allegorical tales along the alchemical magnum opus. Since the medieval period, alchemical allegory has mirrored the passion, death and resurrection of Christ. While the entire series utilises symbols common in alchemy, the Deathly Hallows completes this cycle, tying themes of death, rebirth, and the Resurrection Stone to the principal motif of alchemical allegory, and topics presented in the first book of the series.

Release

Marketing and promotion

The launch was celebrated by an all-night book signing and reading at the Natural History Museum in London, which Rowling attended along with 1,700 guests chosen by ballot. Rowling toured the US in October 2007, where another event was held at Carnegie Hall in New York City with tickets allocated by sweepstake.

Scholastic, the American publisher of the Harry Potter series, launched a multimillion-dollar "There will soon be 7" marketing campaign with a "Knight Bus" travelling to 40 libraries across the United States, online fan discussions and competitions, collectible bookmarks, tattoos, and the staged release of seven Deathly Hallows questions most debated by fans. In the build-up to the book's release, Scholastic released seven questions that fans would find answered in the final book:

 Who will live? Who will die?
 Is Snape good or evil?
 Will Hogwarts reopen?
 Who ends up with whom?
 Where are the Horcruxes?
 Will Voldemort be defeated?
 What are the Deathly Hallows?

J. K. Rowling arranged with her publishers for a poster bearing the face of the missing British child Madeleine McCann to be made available to book sellers when Deathly Hallows was launched on 21 July 2007, and said that she hoped that the posters would be displayed prominently in shops all over the world.

After it was announced that the novel would be released on 21 July 2007, Warner Bros. soon said that the film adaptation of Harry Potter and the Order of the Phoenix would come out shortly before the novel's release, on 13 July 2007, making many people proclaim that July 2007, was the month of Harry Potter.

Spoiler embargo
Bloomsbury invested £10 million in an attempt to keep the book's contents secure until 21 July, the release date. Arthur Levine, US editor of the Harry Potter series, denied distributing any copies of Deathly Hallows in advance for press review, but two US papers published early reviews anyway. There was speculation that some shops would break the embargo and distribute copies of the book early, as the penalty imposed for previous instalments—that the distributor would not be supplied with any further copies of the series—would no longer be a deterrent.

Online leaks and early delivery
In the week before its release, a number of texts purporting to be genuine leaks appeared in various forms. On 16 July, a set of photographs representing all 759 pages of the US edition was leaked and was fully transcribed prior to the official release date. The photographs later appeared on websites and peer-to-peer networks, leading Scholastic to seek a subpoena in order to identify one source. This represented the most serious security breach in the Harry Potter series' history. Rowling and her lawyer confirmed that there were genuine online leaks. Reviews published in both The Baltimore Sun and The New York Times on 18 July 2007, corroborated many of the plot elements from this leak, and about one day prior to release, The New York Times confirmed that the main circulating leak was real.

Scholastic announced that approximately one-ten-thousandth (0.0001) of the US supply had been shipped early — interpreted to mean about 1,200 copies. One reader in Maryland received a copy of the book in the mail from DeepDiscount.com four days before it was launched, which evoked incredulous responses from both Scholastic and DeepDiscount. Scholastic initially reported that they were satisfied it had been a "human error" and would not discuss possible penalties; however, the following day Scholastic announced that it would be launching legal action against DeepDiscount.com and its distributor, Levy Home Entertainment. Scholastic filed for damages in Chicago's Circuit Court of Cook County, claiming that DeepDiscount engaged in a "complete and flagrant violation of the agreements that they knew were part of the carefully constructed release of this eagerly awaited book." Some of the early-release books soon appeared on eBay, in one case being sold to Publishers Weekly for US$250 from an initial price of US$18.

Price wars and other controversies
Asda, along with several other UK supermarkets, having already taken pre-orders for the book at a heavily discounted price, sparked a price war two days before the book's launch by announcing they would sell it for just £5 a copy. Other retail chains then also offered the book at discounted prices. At these prices the book became a loss leader. This caused uproar from traditional UK booksellers who argued they had no hope of competing in those conditions. Independent shops protested loudest, but even Waterstone's, the UK's largest dedicated chain bookstore, could not compete with the supermarket price. Some small bookstores hit back by buying their stock from the supermarkets rather than their wholesalers. Asda attempted to counter this by imposing a limit of two copies per customer to prevent bulk purchases. Philip Wicks, a spokesman for the UK Booksellers Association, said, "It is a war we can't even participate in. We think it's a crying shame that the supermarkets have decided to treat it as a loss-leader, like a can of baked beans." Michael Norris, an analyst at Simba Information, said: "You are not only lowering the price of the book. At this point, you are lowering the value of reading."

In Malaysia, a similar price war caused controversy regarding sales of the book. Four of the biggest bookstore chains in Malaysia, MPH Bookstores, Popular Bookstores, Times and Harris, decided to pull Harry Potter and the Deathly Hallows off their shelves as a protest against Tesco and Carrefour hypermarkets. The retail price of the book in Malaysia was MYR 109.90, while the hypermarkets Tesco and Carrefour sold the book at MYR 69.90. The move by the bookstores was seen as an attempt to pressure the distributor Penguin Books to remove the books from the hypermarkets. However, as of 24 July 2007, the price war had ended, with the four bookstores involved resuming selling the books in their stores with discount. Penguin Books has also confirmed that Tesco and Carrefour were selling the book at a loss, urging them to practice good business sense and fair trade.

The book's early Saturday morning release in Israel was criticised for violating Shabbat. Trade and Industry Minister Eli Yishai commented "It is forbidden, according to Jewish values and Jewish culture, that a thing like this should take place at 2 am on Saturday. Let them do it on another day." Yishai indicated that he would issue indictments and fines based on the Hours of Work and Rest Law.

Editions
Harry Potter and the Deathly Hallows was released in hardcover on 21 July 2007 and in paperback in the United Kingdom on 10 July 2008 and the United States on 7 July 2009. In SoHo, New York, there was a release party for the American paperback edition, with many games and activities. An "Adult Edition" with a different cover illustration was released by Bloomsbury on 21 July 2007. To be released simultaneously with the original US hardcover on 21 July with only 100,000 copies was a Scholastic deluxe edition, highlighting a new cover illustration by Mary GrandPré. In October 2010, Bloomsbury released a "Celebratory" paperback edition, which featured a foiled and starred cover. Lastly, on 1 November 2010, a "Signature" edition of the novel was released in paperback by Bloomsbury.

Translations

As with previous books in the series, Harry Potter and the Deathly Hallows has been translated into many languages. The first translation to be released was the Ukrainian translation, on 25 September 2007 (as Гаррі Поттер і смертельні реліквії – Harry Potter i smertel'ni relikviji). The Swedish title of the book was revealed by Rowling as Harry Potter and the Relics of Death (Harry Potter och Dödsrelikerna), following a pre-release question from the Swedish publisher about the difficulty of translating the two words "Deathly Hallows" without having read the book. This is also the title used for the French translation (Harry Potter et les reliques de la mort), the Spanish translation (Harry Potter y las Reliquias de la Muerte), the Dutch translation (Harry Potter en de Relieken van de Dood), the Serbian translation (Хари Потер и реликвије смрти –  Hari Poter i relikvije smrti) and the Brazilian Portuguese translation (Harry Potter e as Relíquias da Morte). The first Polish translation was released with a new title: Harry Potter i Insygnia Śmierci – Harry Potter and the Insignia of Death. The Hindi translation Harry Potter aur Maut ke Tohfe, which means "Harry Potter and the Gifts of Death", was released by Manjul Publication in India on 27 June 2008. The Romanian version was released on 1 December 2007 using the title (Harry Potter și Talismanele Morții).

Reception

Critical response
The Baltimore Sun critic, Mary Carole McCauley, noted that the book was more serious than the previous novels in the series and had more straightforward prose. Furthermore, reviewer Alice Fordham from The Times wrote that "Rowling's genius is not just her total realisation of a fantasy world, but the quieter skill of creating characters that bounce off the page, real and flawed and brave and lovable". Fordham concluded, "We have been a long way together, and neither Rowling nor Harry let us down in the end". The New York Times writer Michiko Kakutani agreed, praising Rowling's ability to make Harry both a hero and a character that can be related to.

Time magazine's Lev Grossman named it one of the Top 10 Fiction Books of 2007, ranking it at No. 8, and praised Rowling for proving that books can still be a global mass medium. Novelist Elizabeth Hand criticised that "... the spectacularly complex interplay of narrative and character often reads as though an entire trilogy's worth of summing-up has been crammed into one volume." In a starred review from Kirkus Reviews, the reviewer said, "Rowling has shown uncommon skill in playing them with and against each other, and also woven them into a darn good bildungsroman, populated by memorable characters and infused with a saving, irrepressible sense of fun". They also praised the second half of the novel, but criticised the epilogue, calling it "provocatively sketchy". In another review from The Times, reviewer Amanda Craig said that while Rowling was "not an original, high-concept author", she was "right up there with other greats of children's fiction". Craig went on to say that the novel was "beautifully judged, and a triumphant return to form", and that Rowling's imagination changed the perception of an entire generation, which "is more than all but a handful of living authors, in any genre, have achieved in the past half-century".

In contrast, Jenny Sawyer of The Christian Science Monitor said that, "There is much to love about the Harry Potter series, from its brilliantly realised magical world to its multilayered narrative", however, "A story is about someone who changes. And, puberty aside, Harry doesn't change much. As envisioned by Rowling, he walks the path of good so unwaveringly that his final victory over Voldemort feels, not just inevitable, but hollow". In The New York Times, Christopher Hitchens compared the series to World War Two-era English boarding school stories, and while he wrote that "Rowling has won imperishable renown" for the series as a whole, he also stated that he disliked Rowling's use of deus ex machina, that the mid-book camping chapters are "abysmally long", and Voldemort "becomes more tiresome than an Ian Fleming villain". Catherine Bennett of The Guardian praised Rowling for putting small details from the previous books and making them large in Deathly Hallows, such as Grindelwald being mentioned on a Chocolate Frog Card in the first book. While she points out "as her critics say, Rowling is no Dickens", she says that Rowling "has willed into a fictional being, in every book, legions of new characters, places, spells, rules and scores of unimagined twists and subplots".

Stephen King criticised the reactions of some reviewers to the books, including McCauley, for jumping too quickly to surface conclusions of the work. He felt this was inevitable, because of the extreme secrecy before launch which did not allow reviewers time to read and consider the book, but meant that many early reviews lacked depth. Rather than finding the writing style disappointing, he felt it had matured and improved. He acknowledged that the subject matter of the books had become more adult, and that Rowling had clearly been writing with the adult audience firmly in mind since the middle of the series. He compared the works in this respect to Huckleberry Finn and Alice in Wonderland which achieved success and have become established classics, in part by appealing to the adult audience as well as children.

Sales

Sales for Harry Potter and the Deathly Hallows were record-setting. The initial US print run for Deathly Hallows was 12 million copies, and more than a million were pre-ordered through Amazon and Barnes & Noble, 500 percent higher than pre-sales had been for Half-Blood Prince. On 12 April 2007, Barnes & Noble declared that Deathly Hallows had broken its pre-order record, with more than 500,000 copies pre-ordered through its site. On opening day, a record 8.3 million copies were sold in the United States (over 96 per second), and 2.65 million copies in the United Kingdom. It holds the Guinness World record for fastest selling book of fiction in 24 hours for US sales. At WH Smith, sales reportedly reached a rate of 15 books sold per second. By June 2008, nearly a year after it was published, worldwide sales were reportedly around 44 million.

Awards and honours
Harry Potter and the Deathly Hallows has won several awards. In 2007, the book was named one of The New York Times 100 Notable Books, and one of its Notable Children's Books. The novel was named the best book of 2007, by Newsweek critic Malcolm Jones. Publishers Weekly also listed Harry Potter and the Deathly Hallows among their Best Books of 2007. Also in 2007 the book received the Andre Norton Award for Young Adult Science Fiction and Fantasy at the Nebula Awards. In 2008, the American Library Association named the novel one of its Best Books for Young Adults, and also listed it as a Notable Children's Book. Furthermore, Harry Potter and the Deathly Hallows received the 2008 Colorado Blue Spruce Book Award.

Adaptations

Films

The two-part film adaptation of Harry Potter and the Deathly Hallows was directed by David Yates, written by Steve Kloves and produced by David Heyman, David Barron and J. K. Rowling. Part 1 was released on 19 November 2010, and Part 2 on 15 July 2011. Filming began in February 2009, and ended on 12 June 2010. However, the cast confirmed they would reshoot the epilogue scene as they only had two days to shoot the original. Reshoots ended around December 2010. Part 1 ended at Chapter 24 of the book, when Voldemort regained the Elder Wand. However, there were a few omissions, such as the appearances of Dean Thomas and Viktor Krum, and Peter Pettigrew's death. James Bernadelli of Reelviews said that the script stuck closest to the text since Harry Potter and the Chamber of Secrets, yet this was met with negativity from some audiences as the film inherited "the book's own problems".

Audiobooks
Harry Potter and the Deathly Hallows was released simultaneously on 21 July 2007, in both the UK and the United States. The UK edition features the voice of Stephen Fry and runs about 24 hours while the US edition features the voice of Jim Dale and runs about 21 hours. Both Fry and Dale recorded 146 different and distinguishable character voices, and was the most recorded by an individual on an audiobook at the time.

For his work on Deathly Hallows, Dale won the 2008 Grammy Award for the Best Spoken Word Album for Children. He also was awarded an Earphone Award by AudioFile, who claimed, "Dale has raised the bar on audiobook interpretation so high it's hard to imagine any narrator vaulting over it."

Video games
Two action-adventure video games were produced by Electronic Arts (EA) to coincide with the release of the film adaptations, as with each of the previous Harry Potter films. Part 1 was released on 16 November 2010, and Part 2 on 12 July 2011. Both games received a mixed to negative reaction from critics.

Subsequent works

The Tales of Beedle the Bard
On 4 December 2008, Rowling released The Tales of Beedle the Bard both in the UK and US. The Tales of Beedle the Bard is a spin-off of Deathly Hallows and contains fairy tales that are told to children in the "Wizarding World". The book includes five short stories, including "The Tale of the Three Brothers" which is the story of the Deathly Hallows.

Amazon released an exclusive collector's edition of the book which is a replica of the book that Amazon purchased at auction in December 2007.
Seven copies were auctioned off in London by Sotheby's. Each was illustrated and handwritten by Rowling and is 157 pages. It was bound in brown Moroccan leather and embellished with five hand-chased hallmarked sterling silver ornaments and mounted moonstones.

Harry Potter and the Cursed Child
In 2016, Harry Potter and the Cursed Child was released, a two-part play written by Jack Thorne based on an original story by Rowling, Thorne, and John Tiffany. Billed as the eighth story in the Harry Potter series, it picks up where the epilogue of Deathly Hallows left off, following an adult Harry Potter and his son, Albus Severus Potter. Previews of the play began at the Palace Theatre, London, on 7 June 2016, and it premiered on 30 July 2016. The play opened on Broadway on 21 April 2018 at the Lyric Theatre, with previews starting on 16 March 2018.

Both parts of the stage play's script have been released in print and digital formats as Harry Potter and the Cursed Child Parts I & II. The first edition, the Special Rehearsal Edition, corresponded to the script used in the preview shows and was published on 31 July 2016, the date of Harry's birthday in the series and Rowling's birthday, as well. Since revisions to the script continued after the book was printed, an edited version was released on 25 July 2017, as the "Definitive Collector's Edition". According to CNN, this was the most preordered book of 2016.

Notes

References

Bibliography

 Granger, John. The Deathly Hallows Lectures: The Hogwarts Professor Explains the Final Harry Potter Adventure. Zossima Press: 2008. .
 Hall, Susan. Reading Harry Potter: critical essays. Greenwood Publishing: 2003. .
 Rowling, JK. Harry Potter and the Half-Blood Prince. London: Bloomsbury/New York City: Scholastic: 2005. UK /US .
 Rowling, JK. Harry Potter and the Goblet of Fire. London: Bloomsbury/New York City: Scholastic: 2000. UK /US .
 Shapiro, Marc. J. K. Rowling: The Wizard Behind Harry Potter. St. Martin's Press: 2007. .
 Heckl, Raik. "The Tale of the Three Brothers" and the Idea of the Speaking Dead in the Harry Potter Novels . Leipzig: 2008.

External links

 Harry Potter at Bloomsbury.com web site UK publisher book information
 Harry Potter at Scholastic.com web site US publisher book information
  Australia-New Zealand publisher book information

2007 British novels
2007 children's books
2007 fantasy novels
Bloomsbury Publishing books
British novels adapted into films
07
Fiction about shapeshifting
Fiction about rebellions
Novels about totalitarianism
Novels about propaganda
Fiction set in 1997
Fiction set in 1998
Fiction set in 2017
Scholastic Corporation books
Sequel novels
Book leaks
Children's fantasy novels
Andre Norton Award-winning novels